Luxembourg–Palestine relations are bilateral relations between the Grand Duchy of Luxembourg and the State of Palestine. Relations between the two countries are friendly.

President Mahmoud Abbas visited Luxembourg on 15 February 2015, and met with the Grand Duke Henri and senior officials. Luxembourg contributes to the support of UNRWA and condemns Israeli settlements.

Although it has not yet recognized the Palestinian state, it has voted in favor of resolutions on Palestine on many occasions. However, Foreign Minister Jean Asselborn stated his intention to recognize Palestine once a bigger European power takes the lead and has urged EU member states do so. In June 2020, Luxembourg called for the recognition of Palestine if Israel annexed parts of the West Bank.

In August 2020, Luxembourg's Foreign Minister criticized the UAE and Israel's agreement to normalize relations, describing it as an abandonment of the Palestinians by the UAE. He added that peace in the Middle East cannot be achieved without resolving the Israeli–Palestinian conflict.

External links 

Palestine
Luxembourg